Philip Cahill (born November 1966) is an Irish former hurler. At club level he played with Cloyne, divisional side Imokilly and at inter-county level was a member of the Cork senior hurling team. Cahill usually lined out as a forward.

Career

Cahill first played hurling and Gaelic football at juvenile and underage levels with the Cloyne club. He subsequently spent 25 seasons as a player at adult level with the club and won several divisional titles as a dual player as well as a Cork JAHC title in 1987 and a Cork IHC title in 1997. He also earned selection with the Imokilly divisional team and secured the full set of county winners' medals by claiming a Cork SHC title in 1997. Cahill was also part of the Cloyne senior team that lost three consecutive county finals from 2004 to 2006.

Cahill first appeared on the inter-county scene during an unsuccessful tenure with the Cork minor and under-21 teams. He progressed onto the Cork junior hurling team and was part of the All-Ireland JHC-winning team in 1987. Cahill made a number of National Hurling League appearances with the Cork senior hurling team between 1987 and 1989, however, he was never selected for the championship team. He ended his inter-county career as part of the Cork intermediate hurling team that beat Galway in the 1997 All-Ireland intermediate final.

Career statistics

Honours

Cloyne
Cork Intermediate Hurling Championship: 1997
Cork Junior A Hurling Championship: 1987
East Cork Junior A Football Championship: 2001
East Cork Junior A Hurling Championship: 1986, 1987

Imokilly
Cork Senior Hurling Championship: 1997

Cork
All-Ireland Intermediate Hurling Championship: 1997
Munster Intermediate Hurling Championship: 1997
All-Ireland Junior Hurling Championship: 1987
Munster Junior Hurling Championship: 1987, 1992

References

1966 births
Living people
Cloyne Gaelic footballers
Cloyne hurlers
Cork inter-county hurlers
Dual players
Imokilly hurlers